The 2016 Mountain West Conference men's basketball tournament took place March 9–12, 2016 at the Thomas & Mack Center in Las Vegas, Nevada. The winner of the tournament received the conference's automatic bid to the 2016 NCAA tournament.

Seeds
All 11 conference teams participated in the tournament. The top five seeds received first round byes.

Teams were seeded by record within the conference, with a tiebreaker system to seed teams with identical conference records.

Schedule

Bracket

* denotes overtime period

References

Mountain West Conference men's basketball tournament
Tournament
Mountain West Conference men's basketball tournament
Mountain West Conference men's basketball tournament